Rudgur (also Romanized as Rūdgūr and Rood Goor; also known as Kalāt-e Rūd-e Kūr, Kalāteh-ye Rūd-e Ger, Kalāteh-ye Rūd, Kalāteh-ye Rūd-e Gūr, and Kalāt-e Rūd-e Gūr) is a village in Meyghan Rural District, in the Central District of Nehbandan County, South Khorasan Province, Iran. At the 2006 census, its population was 66, in 16 families.

References 

Populated places in Nehbandan County